Christopher Perkins or Chris Perkins may refer to:

 Christopher Perkins (priest) (1547–1622), English Jesuit Dean of Carlisle turned diplomat
 Christopher Perkins (artist) (1891–1968), artist in England and New Zealand
 Chris Perkins (politician) (born 1954), former U.S. Congressman
 Chris Perkins (game designer) (born 1968), American Dungeons & Dragons designer and editor
 Chris Perkins (footballer) (born 1974), English footballer
 Christopher Perkins (archer) (born 1992), Canadian archer

See also
Christopher Steele-Perkins (born 1947), British photographer
Chris Perkin (disambiguation)